The 2009–10 Carolina Hurricanes season was the franchise's 38th season, 31st season in the National Hockey League and 12th as the Hurricanes.

Off-season 
On June 15, 2009, the Carolina Hurricanes announced that they have agreed to terms with their current coaching staff. Head coach Paul Maurice was signed to a multi-year contract. The club also announced Ron Francis will return as associate head coach and take on the additional title of director of player personnel, while Tom Barrasso has been named as an assistant coach, and assistant coaches Kevin McCarthy and Tom Rowe will remain in their roles moving forward and continue on their existing multi-year contracts.

On June 26, 2009, the Hurricanes drafted Philippe Paradis as their first-round, 27th overall selection. Prior to this, the Hurricanes had not had a first-round selection outside of the top 20 since they picked Jamie McBain in the second round, 63rd overall, in the 2006 NHL Entry Draft.

On June 29, 2009, the Hurricanes announced that they have re-signed forward Jussi Jokinen to a two-year contract, with him earning $1.5 million in the upcoming 2009–10 season and $1.9 million in the 2010–11 season. Jokinen was acquired in a trade on February 7, 2009. He scored just one goal, but added 10 assists in 25 regular-season games, but was tied for second on the team for playoff points with 11 points (seven goals and four assists) in 18 games.

On July 24, 2009, the Carolina Hurricanes re-acquired defenceman Aaron Ward from the Boston Bruins in exchange for Patrick Eaves and a fourth-round draft pick in 2010. Ward has previously played with the club when they won the Stanley Cup back in 2006.

On July 28, 2009, the Carolina Hurricanes announced that they have bought-out the remainder of the contract for defenceman Frantisek Kaberle. Kaberle was slated to make $2.2 million during the 2009–10 season, however, with the buyout, he will now receive two-thirds ($1,467,700) of that amount over the next two seasons. Kaberle played 214 games with the club over the span of four seasons.

Pre-season

Regular season 

The Hurricanes had the most power-play opportunities during the regular season, with 329.

Divisional standings

Conference standings

Game log

Playoffs 
Despite their great playoff run the previous year, the Hurricanes failed to make the 2010 playoffs for the first time since the 2007-08 season.

Player statistics

Skaters
Note: GP = Games played; G = Goals; A = Assists; Pts = Points; +/− = Plus/minus; PIM = Penalty minutes

Goaltenders
Note: GP = Games played; TOI = Time on ice (minutes); W = Wins; L = Losses; OT = Overtime losses; GA = Goals against; GAA= Goals against average; SA= Shots against; SV= Saves; Sv% = Save percentage; SO= Shutouts

†Denotes player spent time with another team before joining Hurricanes. Stats reflect time with Hurricanes only.
‡Traded mid-season
Bold/italics denotes franchise record

Awards and records

Awards

Records

Milestones

Transactions 

The Hurricanes have been involved in the following transactions during the 2009–10 season.

Trades 

|}

Free agents acquired

Free agents lost

Claimed via waivers

Lost via waivers

Player signings

Draft picks 

The 2009 NHL Entry Draft was in Montreal, Quebec.

Farm teams

American Hockey League 
The Albany River Rats are the Hurricanes American Hockey League affiliate for the 2009–10 AHL season.

ECHL 
The Florida Everblades are the Hurricanes ECHL affiliate.

References

External links 
2009–10 Carolina Hurricanes season at ESPN
2009–10 Carolina Hurricanes season at Hockey Reference

Carolina Hurricanes seasons
C
C
Hurr
Hurr